Meesiger is a municipality in the Mecklenburgische Seenplatte district, in Mecklenburg-Vorpommern, Germany. It has a population of 305.

References